Ulysses "Crazy Legs" Curtis (May 10, 1926 – October 6, 2013) was an American professional football player who was a running back in the Canadian Football League (CFL) for the Toronto Argonauts from 1950 to 1954. He won two Grey Cups with Toronto in 1950 and 1952.

Curtis was long considered the Argonauts' first black player. On February 2, 2021, it was revealed that Curtis was only their second ever black player after Ken Whitlock, a halfback & kicker who played only 4 games for the Argonauts in 1948.

Curtis is sixth on the Argonauts all-time career touchdown list with 47 touchdowns, fourth on the Argos all-time rushing list with 3,712 yards on 529 carries, second on the Argos all-time list with most yards in a game with 208 yards, and third on the team list of most 100-yard rushing games with 12.

After retirement from football, Curtis remained in Toronto and raised his family.  He owned a cleaning business and later became a teacher and coach in the North York Board of Education.  In 1959 he coached the North York Knights, a team that played in the national Canadian Junior Football championships. He also helped coach the York University football team in the 1960s.

He was named to the Toronto Argonauts All-Time Argos List in 2005.

Curtis died October 6, 2013 in Toronto.

References

Notes

External links

 Historical Albion Michigan bio: Ulysses Curtis

1926 births
2013 deaths
Florida A&M Rattlers football players
Toronto Argonauts players
African-American players of Canadian football
Canadian football running backs
People from Albion, Michigan
Players of American football from Michigan
20th-century African-American sportspeople
21st-century African-American people